Summer Chapel Rectory, Prince Frederick's Episcopal Church is a historic rectory associated with Prince Frederick's Episcopal Church on CR 52 near Plantersville, Georgetown County, South Carolina.  It was built about 1850, and is a -story, "U"-shaped frame building with a clapboard exterior on a raised brick foundation.  It has a standing seam metal gable roof and a one-story engaged porch extends across the façade.  The rectory was moved to its present location in 1877 after the original chapel was abandoned and served as the rectory for Summer Chapel, Prince Frederick's Episcopal Church.

It was listed on the National Register of Historic Places in 1988.

References

Episcopal churches in South Carolina
Properties of religious function on the National Register of Historic Places in South Carolina
National Register of Historic Places in Georgetown County, South Carolina
Houses in Georgetown County, South Carolina
Houses completed in 1850
Clergy houses in the United States